First Unitarian Universalist Church may refer to:

First Unitarian Universalist Church of San Diego
First Unitarian Church of San Jose, San Jose, California, named First Unitarian Universalist Church in its listing on the National Register of Historic Places (NRHP)
First Unitarian Universalist Church of Niagara, Niagara Falls, New York, listed on the NRHP 
All Souls Church (Braintree, Massachusetts), also known as the First Unitarian Universalist Church
First Unitarian Universalist Church of Richmond, Virginia